Aaron Samuel ben Moses Shalom of Kremnitz was the Jewish author of "Nishmat Adam," Hanau, 1611, which contains dissertations on the nature of the soul, purpose of man's existence, the future world, and rewards and punishments.

References

Year of birth missing
Year of death missing
Jewish Hungarian writers
People from Kremnica